Joel Barbosa (born 15 January 1983) is an Argentine footballer who plays as a defender.

Titles
 Boca Juniors 2000 (Copa Libertadores, Intercontinental Cup and Torneo Apertura)
 Boca Juniors 2001 (Copa Libertadores)
 Boca Juniors 2003 (Copa Libertadores, Intercontinental Cup and Torneo Apertura)

External links
 Profile at BDFA 
 

Living people
1983 births
Argentine footballers
Footballers from Córdoba, Argentina
Association football defenders
Boca Juniors footballers
Club Almagro players
Talleres de Córdoba footballers
Nueva Chicago footballers
Club Atlético Sarmiento footballers
Central Norte players
Club Atlético Brown footballers
Club Atlético Atlanta footballers
Argentine Primera División players
Primera Nacional players
Primera B Metropolitana players
Torneo Argentino A players
Argentina under-20 international footballers
Olympic footballers of Argentina
Footballers at the 2003 Pan American Games
Pan American Games medalists in football
Pan American Games gold medalists for Argentina
Medalists at the 2003 Pan American Games